The 41st edition of the annual Clásico RCN was held from August 12 to August 19, 2001 in Colombia. The stage race with a UCI rate of 2.4 started in Medellín and finished in Parque Nacional Circuito. RCN stands for "Radio Cadena Nacional" one of the oldest and largest radio networks in the nation.

Stages

2001-08-12: Medellín–Jericó (124 km)

2001-08-13: Jericó–Manizales (164.4 km)

2001-08-14: Manizales–Anserma (122.2 km)

2001-08-15: Alcalá–Ibagué (155.7 km)

2001-08-16: Ibagué–Mosquera (181.3 km)

2001-08-17: Sopó–Villa de Leyva (143.8 km)

2001-08-18: Villa de Leyva–Tunja (37.6 km)

2001-08-19: Circuito Parque Nacional de Bogotá (102 km)

Final classification

Teams 

05 Orbitel

Lotería de Boyacá

Baterías MAC-Selle Italia-Pacific

Aguardiente Antioqueño-Empresas Públicas de Medellín

Lotería del Táchira (Venezuela)

Aguardiente Cristal

Casanare Inderca

Sorteo Extraordinario de Navidad-Aguardiente Néctar

Nacional 05 Orbitel

Idea-Indeportes Antioquia

Club Cicloases - Los Panches

Cicloases

Mixto

See also 
 2001 Vuelta a Colombia

References 
 cyclingnews
 pedalear

Clásico RCN
Clasico RCN
Clasico RCN